Sir Robert Michael Conal McNair-Wilson (12 October 1930 – 28 March 1993) was a British Conservative Party politician and a Member of Parliament (MP).

Early life
McNair-Wilson was born on 12 October 1930. He attended Eton College before joining the Royal Irish Fusiliers through national service. He then worked for a period at the BBC in Northern Ireland.

Career
McNair-Wilson contested the seat of Lincoln in 1964, but was beaten by Labour's Dick Taverne.

In 1969 he stood as the Conservative candidate in the Walthamstow East by-election, defeating the Labour candidate, Colin Phipps. He held the seat until 1974, when it was abolished and replaced by the new Walthamstow constituency.

In the February 1974 general election he won the Conservative safe seat of Newbury where he remained as MP for 18 years before standing down before the 1992 general election.

Personal life
His brother Patrick McNair-Wilson, who had been Conservative MP for Lewisham West from 1964 to 1966, was also a by-election winner, returning to Parliament in 1968 for the New Forest constituency.

McNair-Wilson married Deidre Granville (née Tuckett) in 1974. Their daughter Laura was elected as MP for Newbury at the 2019 general election.

Death 
McNair-Wilson contracted kidney disease in 1984. He died on 28 March 1993 in Bucklebury, Berkshire.

See also
 List of political families in the United Kingdom

References

External links 
 

 

1930 births
1993 deaths
Conservative Party (UK) MPs for English constituencies
Knights Bachelor
Members of the Bow Group
UK MPs 1966–1970
UK MPs 1970–1974
UK MPs 1974
UK MPs 1974–1979
UK MPs 1979–1983
UK MPs 1983–1987
UK MPs 1987–1992
Politicians awarded knighthoods